Lifelines is the second studio album by Andrea Corr. It was released on 29 May 2011 as a digital download and 30 May 2011 on CD. The album consists of covers of songs by The Velvet Underground, Kirsty MacColl, Harry Nilsson, Ron Sexsmith, Nick Drake, The Blue Nile and others. The lead single, "Tinseltown in the Rain", was released to the iTunes Store on 17 April 2011. 
As well as standard CD and digital download releases, the album was released as a special limited edition with a bonus DVD containing exclusive performances and interviews. To promote the album, Corr has performed songs from it at shows in London, Birmingham, Glasgow, Salford and at the Isle of Wight Festival 2011. She has also promoted it in media interviews and in performances around Europe.

Track listing

† Available as a download using a code included in deluxe edition packages.

Personnel
Andrea Corr - vocals
Kevin Armstrong - guitars
Justin Adams - guitars
Damien Dempsey - acoustic guitar
Clare Kenny - bass
John Reynolds - drums, percussion
Brian Eno - keyboards, sounds, backing vocals (tracks 2, 5)
Julian Wilson - keyboards, Hammond organ
Caroline Dale - cello
Screaming Orphans - backing vocals
James O'Grady - Uilleann pipes

Additional personnel
Sinéad O'Connor - backing vocals (track 7)
Lumiere

Technical personnel
Production - John Reynolds
Co-production - Brian Eno (tracks 2, 5) 
Additional engineers - Adrian Hall, Alan Branch
Mixing - John Reynolds, Tim Oliver 
Mastering - Kevin Metcalf
Design - Peacock
Photography - Jessie Craig

Charts

Release history

References

2011 albums
Covers albums
Andrea Corr albums
Albums produced by Brian Eno